Mukimo, mokimo or irio is a Kenyan meal (predominantly from communities living around Mount Kenya) prepared by mashing potatoes and green vegetables. It may also include maize and beans. Mukimo is mostly served as an accompaniment for meat-based stew and nyama choma. Though originally from the central part of Kenya, mukimo is now consumed amongst various communities in Kenya.

References 

Kenyan cuisine

 One recipe being peas,mashed potato and corn